Lopatkin is a Russian masculine surname, its feminine counterpart is Lopatkina. Notable people with the surname include:

Artyom Lopatkin (born 1975), Russian footballer
Ulyana Lopatkina (born 1973), Russian ballet dancer

Russian-language surnames